The following people and military units have received the Freedom of the City of Manchester.

Individuals 
 Oliver Heywood: 1888.
 Sir Henry Morton Stanley : 1890.
 Abel Heywood: 1891.
 Thomas Ashton, 1st Baron Ashton of Hyde: 1892.
 James Jardine: 1892.
 Professor Sir Adolphus Ward : 1897.
 Herbert Philips : 1897.
 Enriqueta Augustina Rylands: 1899.
 Robert Dukinfield Darbishire: 1899.
 Richard Copley Christie: 1899.
 Sir William Crossley : 1903.
 Alderman Harry Rawson: 1903.
 Sir William Houldsworth : 1905.
 Benn Wolfe Levy: 1905.
 George Milner: 1905.
 Alderman James Wilson Southern: 1906.
 Rt Hon Sir Wilfrid Laurier : 1907.
 Alfred Deakin: 1907.
 Rt Hon Sir Joseph Ward: : 1907.
 Rt Hon Sir Leander Starr Jameson : 1907.
 Rt Hon Sir Robert Bond : 1907.
 Rt Hon Sir Frederick Moor : 1907.
 Rt Hon Louis Botha: 1907.
 Sir Thomas Vansittart Bowater : 1914.
 Rt Hon William Morris Hughes : 1916.
 Sir Edward Holt: 1916.
 Sir Edward Donner : 1916.
 General Maharaja Sir Ganga Singh Bahadur : 1917.
 Sir James Meston : 1917.
 Rt Hon Lord Sinha : 1917.
 Rt Hon Sir Robert Borden : 1917.
 Rt Hon William Massey: 1917.
 Field Marshal Rt Hon Jan Smuts PC OM CH * DTD ED KC FRS: 1917.
 Rt Hon Lord Morris : 1917.
 Rt Hon David Lloyd George: 1918.
 President Woodrow Wilson: 1918.
 Admiral of the Fleet Sir David Beatty : 1919.
 Field Marshal Sir Douglas Haig : 1919.
 Field Marshal Ferdinand Foch: 1923.
 Rt Hon William Lyon Mackenzie King : 1926.
 Rt Hon Lord Bruce of Melbourne : 1926.
 Rt Hon Gordon Coates : 1926.
 General Rt Hon J. B. M. Hertzog : 1926.
 W. T. Cosgrave: 1926.
 Walter Stanley Monroe: 1926.
 Maharajadhiraja Bahadur Sir Bijay Chand Mahtab : 1926.
 C. P. Scott: 1930.
 Rt Hon Earl of Derby : 1934.
 Alderman Hermann Julius Goldschmidt: 1937.
 Alderman William Turner Jackson: 1937.
 Rt Hon Sir Winston Churchill : 1943.
 Field Marshal Rt Hon Sir Bernard Montgomery : 1945.
 Marshal of the Royal Air Force Sir Arthur Tedder : 1945.
 Admiral of the Fleet Rt Hon Lord Cunningham of Hyndhope : 1945.
 Field Marshal Rt Hon Sir Harold Alexander : 1945.
 Alderman Sir William Kay: 1949.
 Rt Hon Clement Attlee : 1953.
 Alderman Sir Miles Ewart Mitchell: 1954.
 Alderman Dame Mary Kingsmill Jones : 1956.
 Alderman Wright Robinson: 1956
 Professor Sir John Stopford : 1956.
 Sir John Barbirolli : 1958.
 Rt Hon Lord Simon of Wythenshawe: 1959.
 Rt Hon Earl of Derby : 1961.
 Lady Simon of Wythenshawe: 1964.
 Sir Matthew Busby  KCSG: 1967.
 Alderman Thomas Francis Regan: 1973.
 Alderman Sir Richard Harper : 1973.
 Alderman Sir Robert Thomas: 1973.
 Alderman Dame Elizabeth Yarwood : 1974.
 Alderman Mrs. Nellie Beer : 1974.
 Professor Sir Bernard Lovell : 1977.
 Alderman Dame Kathleen Ollerenshaw : 1984.
 The Very Reverend Alfred Jowett : 1984.
 Sir Alexander Ferguson : 1999.
 Anthony Wilson: 2007.
 Sir Robert Charlton : 2008.
 Professor Sir Andre Geim  : 9 October 2013.
 Professor Sir Konstantin Novoselov : 9 October 2013.

Military units 
 The Manchester Regiment: 1946.
 613 (City of Manchester) Squadron, RAuxAF: 1957.
 The King's Regiment: 1962.
 The Grenadier Guards: 1964.
 HMS Manchester, RN: 1998.
 The Duke of Lancaster's Regiment: 6 December 2006.
 207 (Manchester) Field Hospital (Volunteers): 2 February 2011

 209 (The Manchester Artillery) Battery 103rd (Lancashire Artillery Volunteers) Regiment Royal Artillery: 25 November 2020.

Honorary citizens
On 12 July 2017, American singer Ariana Grande became the first honorary citizen of Manchester, after a  unanimous vote by the Manchester City Council.

References

Manchester-related lists
Manchester